Cahya Mata Sarawak Berhad (CMSB) is a leading corporation listed on the Main Market of the Malaysian stock exchange, Bursa Malaysia, and is a major private-sector player in Sarawak, the largest state in Malaysia.

Cahya Mata Sarawak literally means "the light of Sarawak's eye" in the Malay language or "Cahya Mata" also figuratively means "the child of".

History
On 8 October 1974, CMSB was incorporated as Cement Manufacturers Sarawak Sdn Bhd. The company address was at 2nd floor of Electra House building at Power Street, Kuching. The first board meeting was commenced on 31 October 1974 by Sarawak state financial secretary Bujang Mohd Nor and chief executive of Sarawak Economic Development Corporation (SEDC) Mohd Amin Satem, with four others, including representatives from Sabah Economic Development Corporation (SEDCO). CMSB was jointly owned by SEDC and SEDCO on 50:50 basis. Bujang Mohd Nor and Mohd Amin Satem both became the first directors on company board.

In 1978, the company set up its first Portland cement manufacturing plant in Pending Industrial Estate, Kuching. This makes Sarawak less dependent on imported cement for the local housing industry. Sarawak previously imported Green Island cement from Hong Kong through Borneo Company Limited. In 1989, CMSB was listed on Bursa Malaysia main board, making it the first company from Sarawak being listed on Bursa Malaysia.

In 1994, CMSB created two subsidiary companies, namely CMS Cement Sdn Bhd and CMS Properties Sdn Bhd. CMSB also acquired shares in three SEDC subsidiaries, namely Sara Kuari Sdn Bhd (where PPES Works (Sarawak) Sdn Bhd and PPES Premix Sdn Bhd were the subsidiaries of Sara Kuari); Steel Industry Sarawak Bhd; and PCMS Sdn Bhd. CMSB also acquired Sarawak Works Department premix plants. CMSB also acquired Archipelago Shipping (Sarawak) Sdn Bhd in 1996. Archipelago Shipping was later renamed as CMS Transportation Sdn Bhd. In November 2001, another company named Achi Jaya Services Sdn Bhd offered to acquire CMS Transportation Sdn Bhd for RM30 million. The transaction was completed in January 2003.

On 13 June 1996, the company changed its name to Cahya Mata Sarawak Berhad (literally means "Sarawak's favourite son"). The name change is further reinforced by its mission statement "To be the pride of Sarawak and beyond". The original blue colour of its logo was changed to yellow, red, and black, reflecting the colours of the Sarawak flag. The interlocking logo represents Yin and yang, reflecting the company's main activities at that time namely: infrastructure and investment.

On 26 December 2000, CMSB reached an agreement with Peninsular Malaysia based K&N Kenaga Sdn Bhd where CMS futures and securities business were sold to Kenaga in exchange for 25% shares in Kenaga. On 1 May 2003, CMSB subsidiary, Utama banking group, was merged with RHB Bank to form RHB Group, in keeping with Bank Negara’s policy of consolidating Malaysia’s banking industry. Utama banking group obtained 32.8% of RHB Group shares during this merger. In 2007, Employees Provident Fund (EPF) purchased all the RHB shares owned by Utama banking group for RM 2.25 billion. In 2008, Utama banking group acquired CMS Roads and CMS Pavement Tech by offering shares to PPES Works (Sarawak) Sdn Bhd (a subsidiary of CMSB) and cash payments to SEDC. In 2009, Utama Banking Group disposed CMS Roads Sdn Bhd and CMS Pavement Tech Sdn Bhd to Putrajaya Perdana Bhd.

In 2010, CMSB disposed Utama banking group to Petro Saudi International Ltd, an investment company based in Saudi Arabia for cash return. In the same year, CMSB ceased the operations of its loss making ICT subsidiary company "I-system Group Berhad" after acquired it for five years. In 2011, CMSB reacquired CMS Roads and CMS Pavement Tech. In the same year, CMSB entered a joint venture with OM Materials Pte Ltd to operate ferrosilicon and manganese ferroalloys Smelter at Similajau Industrial Park. In 2013, CMSB entered a joint venture with Malaysian Phosphate Venture Sdn Bhd (MPV) and Arif Enigma Sdn Bhd (AESB) to form a company named Malaysian Phosphate Additives (Sarawak) Sdn Bhd (MPAS) at Similajau Industrial Park. In the same year, CMSB became top 100 Malaysian companies in terms of market capitalisation.

In 2014, CMSB worked with Germany-based Christian Pfeiffer Maschinenfabrik GmbH to develop a new cement grinding plant in Mambong. On 22 September 2014, first ferrosilicon slab was successfully produced by OM Materials ferrosilicon and manganese ferroalloys Smelter at Similajau Industrial Park. In 2015, CMSB increased its stake in the OM Materials ferroalloys plant in Samalaju by 5%. In 2016, CMSB subsidiary PPES Works (Sarawak) Sdn Bhd was involved in the construction of Datuk Temenggong Abang Kipali bin Abang Akip Interchange at Petra Jaya, Kuching. In 2017, CMSB collaborated with Leburaya Borneo Utara on using water jets and pressure bars in constructions of Pan Borneo Highway. On 9 March 2018, CMSB, Ibraco Berhad and the HELP Education Group signed an agreement to establish Tunku Putra-HELP International School (TPHIS). In the same year, CMS Cement Industries Sdn Bhd collaborate with UNIMAS Holdings Sdn Bhd on the development of the concrete made from Portland Limestone Cement and Portland Composite Cement.

Corporate affairs

Subsidiaries

PPES Works (Sarawak) Sdn Bhd
This company, a joint venture with the Sarawak Economic Development Corporation (SEDC), is a long-established and leading construction company in Sarawak, having built many iconic projects over the years. With its wealth of experience it continues to undertake a wide range of civil engineering, building and utility works (including dams, undersea pipe lay and other water-related works) as well as road construction and road maintenance.

CMSB via PPES Works (Sarawak) Sdn Bhd (PPESW) sets a joint venture (jv) with Bina Puri Sdn Bhd (BPSB) via an associate company, PPESW BPSB JV Sdn Bhd. its role is  the main contractor for Sg Awik to Bintangor Junction in work package contract (WPC06).

PPESW BPSB JV Sdn Bhd is flanked together with Endaya TRC PK JV Sdn Bhd (WPC05; Batang Skrang to Sg. Awik) and HSL DMIA JV Sdn Bhd (WPC07; Bintangor Junction to Sg. Kua Bridge).

CMS Works Sdn Bhd
This company and its subsidiaries undertake general construction, specialist infrastructure projects, road maintenance concessions and road laying and rehabilitation works. This company also owns a fleet of construction and road maintenance equipment, as well as vehicles to meet the division's needs.

CMS Roads Sdn Bhd 
Using an internationally recognised road management and maintenance system, its scope of works includes maintenance and repair of road surfaces as well as road markings and furnishings, such as signage and lighting.

CMS Pavement Tech Sdn Bhd 
This company is a specialised provider of construction, maintenance and rehabilitation services for road pavements. This includes processes such as cement stabilisation, pavement profiling and the recycling of existing pavements in an environmentally friendly manner. These processes offer cost savings, speed of construction and improved pavement performance and life.

References

External links
Company site

Sarawak
Conglomerate companies of Malaysia
1974 establishments in Malaysia
Conglomerate companies established in 1974
Companies listed on Bursa Malaysia